The Retrieval is a 2013 American drama film written and directed by Chris Eska. The film stars Ashton Sanders, Tishuan Scott, Keston John, Bill Oberst Jr., Christine Horn and Alfonso Freeman. The film was released on April 2, 2014, by Variance Films.

The film centers around Will, a Black boy during the American Civil War, and Nate— a Black Union soldier who is the target of bounty hunters. Will has been forcibly pressed into a bounty hunter gang, because his age and assumed innocence are useful in luring unsuspecting targets in. He plots to deliver Nate from up North down to a prearranged location in the South for his gang to kill Nate, but along the way he struggles with this decision as Nate becomes more of a father figure.

Cast
 Ashton Sanders as Will
 Tishuan Scott as Nate
 Keston John as Marcus
 Bill Oberst Jr. as Burrell
 Christine Horn as Rachel
 Alfonso Freeman as Isaac
 Raven Nicole LeDeatte as Abby 
 Jonathan Brooks as Royce
 Jody Stelzig as Chasing Cavalryman
 Sam Pullin as Ryan

Release
The film premiered at South by Southwest on March 11, 2013. The film was released on April 2, 2014, by Variance Films.

See also
 List of films featuring slavery

References

External links
 

2013 films
2013 drama films
American drama films
2010s English-language films
2010s American films